Asnières-sur-Oise (literally "Asnières on Oise") is a commune in the Val-d'Oise department in Île-de-France in northern France. The 13th–18th century Royaumont Abbey is located in the commune.

Population

Twin towns
 Cutigliano, Italy

See also
Communes of the Val-d'Oise department

References

External links

Official website 

Association of Mayors of the Val d'Oise 

Communes of Val-d'Oise